Sector 56 (commonly known as Phase 6) is residential and entry level sector located in Chandigarh. It is famous for Verka Milk Plant and Dara Studio, owned by Dara Singh. Also the sector have many marriage palaces such as celebration, Libra orchidand motor market. It is covered with Sector 54, 55, 57, Bar Majra. Seasonal Stream Patiali Ki Rao also touches this sector.

Facilities

Banks
 Oriental Bank of Commerce
 Corporation bank

Healthcare
 Max Super Specialty Hospital
 Civil Hospital Mohali

Education
 Shivalik Public School
 Govt. College
 Government Model Senior Secondary School

Religious
 Shri Durga Mata Mandir Phase 6
 Gurdrwara Phase 6
 Sant Satsang Bhawan
Went to desulphurisation Vasco 
Daryl Fukushima

Access
Sector 56 is situated on Kharar Chandigarh Road and Franco Hotel Road. It is well connected with road, rail and air. The nearest airports are Chandigarh Airport and railway station at Industrial Area - Phase 9. It is entry point from all sides of punjab towards Mohali Bus Stand. Auto rickshaw are easily available for commuting. It is easy to commute by bus as all buses to and fro punjab stops in this Sector. A few CTU local buses also available connecting PGI and Landran.

References

Mohali
Sectors of Mohali